The 1999 Nigerian House of Representatives elections in Taraba State was held on February 20, 1999, to elect members of the House of Representatives to represent Taraba State, Nigeria.

Overview

Summary

Results

Bali/Gassol 
PDP candidate Dahiru Bako Gassol won the election, defeating other party candidates.

Jalingo/Yorro/Zing 
PDP candidate Alhassan Al-Gaddas won the election, defeating other party candidates.

Karim Lamido/Lau/Ardo-Kola 
PDP candidate Tauru T. Hanin won the election, defeating other party candidates.

Sardauna/Gashaka/Kurmi 
PDP candidate Kuriya Tafarki Auta won the election, defeating other party candidates.

Takuma/Donga/Ussa 
APP candidate Abdulaziz Tanko won the election, defeating other party candidates.

Wukari/Ibi 
PDP candidate Dantani Sunsuwa won the election, defeating other party candidates.

References 

Taraba State House of Representatives elections
Taraba
February 1999 events in Nigeria